Jack David Vincent Whatmough (born 19 August 1996) is an English footballer who plays for Wigan Athletic as a centre back.

Club career

Portsmouth
Whatmough was born in Gosport and played for Southampton. At the age of 13 he decided to leave Southampton F.C. He then trained with Portsmouth and joined Academy. He signed a two-year scholarship deal with Pompey on 6 July 2012.

On 14 August 2012, Whatmough appeared on the bench in a 0–3 away defeat against Plymouth Argyle. He finished the season with 26 youth appearances, with the Academy being crowned champions.

On 19 August 2013, Whatmouth signed a three-year professional deal. On 28 September he appeared again on the bench, in a 2–4 away defeat against York City.

On 26 November, Whatmough made his professional debut, starting in a 1–2 home loss against Southend United. He signed a contract extension with Portsmouth on 10 April 2014, later revealing via Twitter that his deal was extended until 2017.

On 6 January 2016, Whatmough joined Havant and Waterlooville on a one-month loan to continue his rehabilitation from a serious knee injury which had kept him out since March 2015.

On 25 February 2017, Whatmough scored his first professional goal for Portsmouth in a 3–0 away win over Carlisle United In June 2021, Whatmough left Portsmouth at the end of his contract.

Wigan Athletic
On 4 June 2021, Whatmough joined fellow League One side Wigan Athletic on a free transfer. He scored his first goal for Wigan in a 4-1 win at Accrington Stanley on 18 September 2021. The 2021–22 season saw Wigan promoted as Champions, Whatmough being named Wigan Athletic's Player of the Season.

On 13 February 2023, he signed a new eighteen-month contract.

International career
On 16 December 2013, Whatmough was called up to train with England U18's. He then made his international debut on 5 March of the following year, starting in a 1–2 loss against Croatia at St George's Park.

Career statistics

Honours
Wigan Athletic
EFL League One: 2021–22

Portsmouth
EFL League Two: 2016–17
EFL Trophy runner-up: 2019–20

Individual
PFA Team of the Year: 2021–22 EFL League One
Wigan Athletic Player of the Year: 2021–22

References

External links

1996 births
Living people
People from Gosport
English footballers
England youth international footballers
Association football defenders
Portsmouth F.C. players
Havant & Waterlooville F.C. players
Wigan Athletic F.C. players
English Football League players
National League (English football) players